Lê Thuần Tông (chữ Hán: 黎純宗, 16 March 1699 – 5 June 1735) birth name Lê Duy Tường (黎維祥, 黎維祜) was the thirteenth and fourth-last emperor of the Vietnamese Lê dynasty under the domination of the Trịnh lords. He reigned from 1732 to 1735 and was succeeded by Lê Ý Tông.

References

Thuan Tong
1699 births
1735 deaths
18th-century Vietnamese monarchs
Vietnamese monarchs